Jürgen Otto Wöhler (born 10 May 1950, in Oberlahnstein) is a German lawyer and manager. He has served as Secretary General of the Korean-German Chamber of Commerce and Industry in Seoul from June, 2007, to May, 2012.

Education

After the Abitur, Wöhler joined the German Army (since 1987 Major) and in 1977 successfully completed his studies in law, economics, history and politics at the University of Tübingen and the University of Geneva. After the first legal state examination in 1977, he went to Georgetown University, Washington D.C., as a research fellow. In 1978 he received a Master in Comparative Law from the University of Strasbourg. In 1980 he completed the second legal state examination in Stuttgart and received the admission to advocacy.

Career

From 1981 to 1983 Wöhler was executive of the building legislation office as an official of the Interior Ministry of Baden-Württemberg. From 1983 to 1985 he worked as a permanent representative to the State Ministry of Baden-Württemberg in the Bundestag in Bonn. From 1985 to 1987 he was Deputy Managing Director of the Investment Consulting and Legal Department of the Korean-German Chamber of Commerce and Industry in Seoul. From 1987 to 2007 he was executive director responsible for foreign operations at the Landesbank Baden-Württemberg in Stuttgart and since April 2007 is Secretary General of the Korean-German Chamber of Commerce and Industry.

Furthermore, Wöhler is a registered arbitrator at the Korean Commercial Arbitration Board and Member of the Chartered Institute of Arbitrators (MCIArb) in London. Recent publications include a paper in the Hankuk University of Foreign Studies (HUFS) Global Law Review.

Honors

 Federal Cross of Merit of the Federal Republic of Germany, 2009
 Sungrye Medal for "Diplomatic Service Merit" of the Republic of Korea, 2008
 Officier de l'Ordre national du Mérite of the French Republic, 2006

References

1950 births
Living people
Recipients of the Cross of the Order of Merit of the Federal Republic of Germany
Officers of the Ordre national du Mérite
People from Rhein-Lahn-Kreis
University of Tübingen alumni
Georgetown University alumni
Jurists from Rhineland-Palatinate